Schwartziella abacocubensis is a species of minute sea snail, a marine gastropod mollusk or micromollusk in the family Zebinidae.

Distribution
This species occurs in the Gulf of Mexico, the Caribbean Sea off Cuba and the Atlantic Ocean off the Bahamas.

Description 
The maximum recorded shell length is 4 mm.

Habitat 
Minimum recorded depth is 0 m. Maximum recorded depth is 18 m.

References

 Espinosa J. & Ortea J. (2002) Descripción de cuatro nuevas especies de la familia Rissoinidae (Mollusca: Gastropoda). Avicennia 15: 141-146.
page(s): 143
 Rosenberg, G., F. Moretzsohn, and E. F. García. 2009. Gastropoda (Mollusca) of the Gulf of Mexico, Pp. 579–699 in Felder, D.L. and D.K. Camp (eds.), Gulf of Mexico–Origins, Waters, and Biota. Biodiversity. Texas A&M Press, College Station, Texas.
 Rolán E. & Fernández-Garcés R. (2010) The shouldered species of the Rissoininae (Mollusca: Rissooidea) in the Caribbean with the description of three new species. Novapex 11(4): 83-91 page(s): 85

External links
 

abacocubensis
Gastropods described in 2002
Molluscs of the Atlantic Ocean
Fauna of the Bahamas
Invertebrates of Cuba